Fort Duurstede is a 17th-century colonial Dutch fort in Saparua, Indonesia The fort originally protected Saparoea village. A navigation guide from 1878 advises: "There is good anchorage near this fort in the westerly monsoon in about 12 fathoms."

The fort is open to the public and has been heavily restored.

References 

Dutch East Indies
Duurstede